Marlene is a 2020 Canadian docudrama film, directed by Wendy Hill-Tout. The film centres on the case of Steven Truscott, a Canadian man who spent many years in prison after being wrongfully convicted of a murder he did not commit, through the eyes of his wife Marlene.

The film stars Kristin Booth as Marlene Truscott, and Greg Bryk as Steven Truscott. Julia Sarah Stone and Dempsey Bryk also appear as the younger Marlene and Steven in flashback scenes.

The film was shot in 2019, with the working title Chasing Justice. It premiered at the 2020 Calgary International Film Festival. It was subsequently screened at the 2020 Whistler Film Festival, where it was named runner-up for the Whistler Film Festival Audience Award.

Janal Bechthold received a Canadian Screen Award nomination for Best Original Score at the 9th Canadian Screen Awards in 2021.

References

External links

2020 films
2020 drama films
Canadian biographical drama films
Canadian docudrama films
Canadian films based on actual events
English-language Canadian films
2020s English-language films
2020s Canadian films

Films about capital punishment